The following table is a list of films produced in Denmark or in the Danish language before 1910. For an alphabetical list of all Danish films currently on Wikipedia see :Category:Danish films. For Danish films from other decades see the Cinema of Denmark box above.

External links
 Danish film at the Internet Movie Database
 about danish movies 1897-1900

1890s
Films
Danish
Films
Danish